Kanji (Odia: କାଞ୍ଜି) is a rice water based dish traditionally prepared in Odisha. Depending on how it is prepared, it is eaten as a porridge, soup or curry. It is one of the Chappan Bhog (56 food items also known as Mahaprasad) offered to Lord Jagannath of Puri as part of the last meal of the day ( known as Badaw Singhara Bhogaw).  During the Odia festival of Kanji Anla Osha, kanji is offered to Goddesses Sathi.

Variations
There are many varieties of kanji prepared in various parts of Odisha.

Dawhi (curd) kanji
There are mostly two variations of dawhi kanji. In one, boiled rice is used as the base and in the other gram flour (Besan) or rice flour is used.

 Dahi Kanji using boiled rice: Rice is cooked in a Karahi (Odia: କଡ଼େଇ Indian wok) along with turmeric powder and salt as per taste. The rice is let to be over cooked so that it becomes soft and then curd is added to it. After cooking for some time it is removed from heat and chhunka (Odia: ଛୁଙ୍କ tempered spice)  is added to it and mixed. Chhunka is prepared by heating some mustard oil and adding, pancha phutan, crushed ginger and garlic, red chilies, curry leaves, asafoetida (optional) and roasting them for some time. Dawhi kanji is usually served along with boiled rice or can be eaten as a main dish.

 Dahi Kanji using gram flour (Odia: ବେସନ): To prepare this dish, curd along with gram flour or rice flour is added to water and boiled. Salt and turmeric powder is added as per taste and the once cooked is removed from heat. Chunka is them added to it.

Pariba (vegetable) kanji
Raw cut vegetables like radish, ash gourd, okra, pumpkin, drumsticks and aubergine are cut and added to water in a Karahi (Odia: କଡ଼େଇ Indian wok). Any other locally grown green vegetables can also be used. Turmeric powder, ginger and salt is added and let to boil till the vegetables are cooked. In a separate bowl, curd and gram flour or rice flour is mixed with water and added to the boiling vegetables. Once cooked it is removed from the heat and chhunka (Odia: ଛୁଙ୍କ tempered spice)  is added to it and mixed. Pariba kanji is served along with rice. Also known as ambila (Odia: ଆମ୍ବିଳ) or simply kanji, this dish is quite popular in Western and Southern Odisha.

Torani (water of cooked rice or Pakhala) kanji
The main ingredient involved in making this dish are torani (Odia: ତୋରାଣି) also known as "peja torani" (Odia: ପେଜ ତୋରାଣି) which is the rice water extracted after boiling rice. The extracted rice water is usually left for few days to ferment until it develops sour flavors. Optionally a piece of Ambula (Odia: ଆମ୍ବୁଲ) can be added to it. During the fermentation process, fresh rice water is added everyday to the base rice water. Once it starts to give off a sour aroma, it's ready to be cooked to make Torani kanji. To prepare the kanji, vegetables such as pumpkin, radish, drumsticks, beans, ivy gourd, okra, ash gourd or any locally grown vegetables are cut and boiled in the kanji along with some water. Turmeric powder and salt is added as per taste. Optionally 1-2 pieces of ambula (pickled green mangos) can be added to make it sour if the rice water was not sour enough. Once all the vegetables are boiled and the kanji thickens, it is removed from the heat and chunkaw is added to it. To prepare chunkaw, heat mustard oil and add panchaw phutanaw, curry leaves, ginger, dry red chilies and roast it for some time. Once the color starts to change remove from heat. This variation of kanji is particularly popular in southern Odisha. 

During Kanji Anla Osha which falls in the month of October or November, Torani Kanji is offered to Goddesses Shathi (Odia: ଷଠି) along with dried fish and anla, radish curry, poi and other puja items. Farmers also offer kanji to their farmlands for a good harvest.

Shāg / Patra (greens) kanji
When torani kanji is prepared by adding any greens known as shag (ଶାଗ) in Odia, it's called shāg or patra kanji. Usually any of the locally available greens such as drumstick leaves (Odia: ସଜନା ଶାଗ) or shallot leaves (Odia: ଗନ୍ଧନା gandhanā) or purple amaranthus (Odia: କୋସଳା koshala) or gorkura (Odia: ଗୋର୍କୁରା) also known as khtaa palanga (Odia: ଖଟା ପାଳଙ୍ଗ).

While the above variations are commonly prepared across Odisha, there are also many regional variations like prawn (Odia: ଚିଙ୍ଗୁଡି chingudi) kanji, crab (Odia: କଙ୍କଡା kankadā) kanji, dry fish (Odia: ଶୁଖୁଆ shukhuā and  khadā (Odia: ଖଡା) kanji.

Health Benefits
Kanji acts as a coolant during summer, promotes digestion, and is very nutritious.

See also
 Congee, a related food whose name originates from Tamil kanji (kañci)

References 

Odia cuisine
Indian rice dishes